Jane Gordon may refer to:
Jane Gordon, Duchess of Gordon (1749–1812), Scottish Tory political hostess
Jane Gordon, pen-name of author Margaret Graves (1901–1962) 
Jane Gordon (jewelry designer) (born 1957), American jewelry designer
Jane Gordon, Viscountess Kenmure (died 1675) Scottish patron of ministers

See also
Jean Gordon (disambiguation)